Shrek Forever After (also known as Shrek 4, and Shrek Forever After: The Final Chapter) is an action-adventure video game based on the film of the same name. It was released on May 18, 2010, in North America. It is the fourth video game based on the movie series of Shrek. Shrek Forever After was the Final game released under Activision’s 2002 licensing agreement with DreamWorks Animation. It is the only Shrek video game available for the PlayStation 3. The Shrek games were removed from digital storefronts on January 1, 2014.

Gameplay
This video game is based on the fourth Shrek movie. Players can play as Shrek, Fiona, Donkey, and Puss in Boots, having support up to four players. They can travel through different worlds and solve puzzles.

Plot
It follows Shrek who has become a domesticated family man, living happily with Princess Fiona and the triplets. Instead of scaring villagers away like he used to, a reluctant Shrek now agrees to autograph pitch forks. Longing for the days when he felt like a "real ogre", Shrek's tricked into signing a pact with the smooth-talking dealmaker, Rumpelstiltskin. Shrek suddenly finds himself in a twisted, alternate version of Far Far Away, where ogres are hunted, and because Rumpelstiltskin is king, Shrek and Fiona have never met. Now, it's up to Shrek to undo all of Rumpelstiltskin's mischief in the hopes of saving his friends, restoring his world and reclaiming his one True Love and family.

Reception

The game was met with mixed to negative reception.  GameRankings and Metacritic gave it a score of 87% and 71 out of 100 for the DS version; 65.47% and 62 out of 100 for the Xbox 360 version; 63.75% and 57 out of 100 for the PlayStation 3 and Wii versions; 55% and 60 out of 100 for the iOS version; and 56 out of 100 for the PC version.

In its August 2010 issue, Official Xbox Magazine commented that the game is "hamstrung by long, dull stretches", and gave it a score of six out of ten. Gaming Nexus concluded "It is a family oriented action game that sticks to the mold of the genre from beginning to end. The younger gamers will thoroughly enjoy the adventure and older gamers won't be completely annoyed by having to either watch or play along."

The game sold 54,000 units in the United States.

References

External links
 Official website

2010 video games
Shrek video games
Nintendo DS games
Wii games
3D platform games
Xbox 360 games
PlayStation 3 games
Windows games
IOS games
Video games developed in Taiwan
J2ME games
Gameloft games
Multiplayer and single-player video games